Karyms is an ethnic group in Russia which are métises of mixing Russians with Evenks and Buryats resulting from the lack of women among Russian settlers.

In the 2002 Russian Census, 2 persons self-identified themselves as Karyms and were included into the ethnicity "Russians".

The Russian volcano, Karymsky was named after the ethnic group.

References

Ethnic groups in Russia
Multiracial affairs